Nectophrynoides viviparus is a species of toad in the family Bufonidae. It is endemic to Tanzania. Common names robust forest toad and Morogoro tree toad have been coined for it.

Description
The skin is smooth and has many small mucous glands. The paratoid glands are prominent just behind the eyes and nearby are circular tympani (eardrums). It also has large glands on its limbs which usually contrast in colour with the rest of the skin. The digits on the hands and feet are partially webbed. Some individuals are black with white markings, others are grey, green or dull red. In 2011, a new species of toad, Callulina meteora, was described from the mountains of Tanzania and has similarly large, contrastingly coloured glands on its limbs.

Distribution and habitat
This species is known from the Uluguru Mountains and Udzungwa Mountains in eastern and southern Tanzania.

Biology
Nectophrynoides viviparus is a terrestrial species and is ovoviviparous, which implies that it does not require a body of water in which to reproduce. Fertilisation is internal and the eggs develop through the larval stage inside the mother's oviduct, eventually emerging as fully formed juvenile toads.

Status
It is threatened by habitat loss caused by agricultural activity, wood collection, and human habitations, especially at lower altitudes. Although relatively common, populations in general appear to be declining.

References

viviparus
Frogs of Africa
Amphibians of Tanzania
Endemic fauna of Tanzania
Amphibians described in 1905
Taxa named by Gustav Tornier
Taxonomy articles created by Polbot